Ron Finn (born December 1, 1940 in Toronto, Ontario) is a Canadian retired National Hockey League linesman. His career started in 1969 and ended in 2000. During his career, he officiated 2,373 regular season games and two All-Star games as well as Rendez-vous '87, and four Canada Cups. He worked twelve Stanley Cup Finals from 1979–1990. His uniform number is #26 and #77 when the NHL reinstated issuing numbers to officials in 1995 (it was discontinued in 1977). He had two sons, Sean and Shannon, who also played.

References
 The National Hockey League Official Guide & Record Book/1993-94

1940 births
Living people
National Hockey League officials
Ice hockey people from Toronto